

Biography
She was born Jacqueline Beaugé in Jérémie, Haiti and was educated at the Institution Notre-Dame-de-Lourdes there. She entered a convent at Kenscoff but left for health reasons. She then trained as a teacher at Notre-Dame-de-Lourdes, graduating in 1952. She taught at Édmée-Rey school until 1953, then at the Lycée Pétion in Port-au-Prince until 1969 and at the Collège Roger Anglade from 1971 to 1975. After she married Jacques V. Rosier, she left Haiti and settled in Canada. She continued her studies at Algonquin College, at the Université du Québec à Hull and at Ottawa University, earning a master's degree in French literature. She then taught school in Ottawa until her retirement in 2004.

From 1957 to 1962, Beaugé-Rosier was associated with the "Haïti littéraire" poets and, from 1964 to 1966, she was a member of the literary group Houghenikon. In Canada, she became a member of the Association des Auteures et auteurs francophones d'Ontario.

In 1991, she received the Trophée de la Tonnelle Haïtienne de l'Ouataouais. In 1993, she was awarded second prize in a literary competition sponsored by the Société des écrivains  de Toronto. In 2000, she received the Plaque d'Honneur from the Haitian community of Canada for her contributions to Franco-Ontarian literature and to Haitian-Canadian cultural development.

Jacqueline Beaugé-Rosier passed away in Ottawa, Ontario, Canada. The obituary was featured in Ottawa Citizen on August 4, 2016.

Selected works 
 Climats en marche, poetry (1962)
 À Vol d'ombre, poetry (1966)
 Les Cahiers de la mouette, poetry and stories (1983)
 D'Or vif et de pain, poetry (1992)
 Les Yeux de l'anse du Clair, novel (2001)

References 

1932 births
2016 deaths
Haitian women poets
20th-century Haitian poets
21st-century Haitian novelists
Canadian poets in French
Canadian novelists in French
Algonquin College alumni
Université du Québec en Outaouais alumni
University of Ottawa alumni
Franco-Ontarian people
20th-century Canadian poets
20th-century Canadian short story writers
21st-century Canadian novelists
Canadian women poets
Canadian women novelists
Canadian women short story writers
Black Canadian writers
Black Canadian women
Haitian emigrants to Canada
Writers from Ottawa
20th-century Canadian women writers
21st-century Canadian women writers
21st-century Canadian short story writers